Raising may refer to:
Raising (linguistics), a syntactic construction
Raising (phonetics), a sound change
Raising (metalworking), a metalworking technique
Barn raising, a community event to erect the wooden framework for a building
Fundraising, a method of raising money, usually for non-profits and schools

See also 
Raise (disambiguation)

Raising Hell (disambiguation)
Raising the Bar (disambiguation)
Raising the Wind (disambiguation)